Crispe is a surname. Notable people with the surname include:

 Asher Crispe, American Orthodox rabbi
 Henry Crispe (by 1505–1575), English landowner and politician
 Nicholas Crispe ( 1599–1666), English royalist and merchant
 Crispe baronets